Norberto Font y Sagué (1874–1910) was a Spanish geologist, naturalist and writer.

1874 births
1910 deaths
Catalan-language writers
Spanish geologists